The 1956 NCAA Tennis Championships were the 11th annual NCAA-sponsored tournaments to determine the national champions of men's singles, doubles, and team collegiate tennis in the United States.

UCLA won the Team Championship, the Bruins' Fifth such title (and fourth in five years). UCLA finished just one point ahead of rivals (and defending champions) USC, 15–14, in the team standings.

Host site
This year's tournaments were contested at Stowe Tennis Stadium at Kalamazoo College in Kalamazoo, Michigan.

Team scoring
Until 1977, the men's team championship was determined by points awarded based on individual performances in the singles and doubles events.

References

External links
List of NCAA Men's Tennis Champions

NCAA Division I tennis championships
NCAA Division I Tennis Championships
NCAA Division I Tennis Championships